Odessa is a village in the Canadian province of Saskatchewan within the Rural Municipality of Francis No. 127 and Census Division No. 6. The community is located 60 km southeast of the City of Regina on Highway 48.

History 
Odessa incorporated as a village on March 14, 1911.

Demographics 

Sports 

General

Like all small communities in Saskatchewan, Odessa thrives on sports. Odessa itself consists of one ice hockey arena, two grass ball diamonds and three dirt ball diamonds, as well as an indoor gymnasium at the community center. These facilities provide opportunities for numerous activities including Ice Hockey, Broomball, Ringette, Baseball, Softball, Slowpitch, Volleyball, Badminton, Floor Hockey, and Basketball.

Teams (Not each age group and sport has a team)

Hockey:Odessa Eagles - All AgesOdessa Beagals - RecreationBroomball:Odessa Bandits - Midget & Junior BoysOdessa Flames - Midget & Junior GirlsThe Outlaws - Senior MensOdessa Renegades - Senior Mens Odessa Storm - Senior Women'sBaseball:Odessa Expos - All Ages

Titles 
1998:National Champions - Odessa Bandits (Jr.) 
2009:National Champions - Odessa Bandits (Jr.)Provincial Champions - Odessa Bandits (Jr.)
2008:SCMHL Champions - Odessa Eagles (Midget II)
2007:SCMHL Champions - Odessa Eagles (Midget II)
2006:SCMHL Champions - Odessa Eagles (Midget II)
Other:2002 SCMHL Champions - Odessa Wings (Midget I)

Business 

Organizations and Businesses in Odessa include:- Odessa Co-op (Gas Station & Convenience Store)- Phil's Electric - Hoffart's Services Inc. (Behlen & HSI Manufacturing)- Adam's Welding and Machine Shop- Odessa Community Rink (Arena)- SGI Odessa Branch- Plainsveiw Credit Union (Odessa Branch)- Chuckers Place (Odessa Bar)

See also 

 List of communities in Saskatchewan
 Villages of Saskatchewan

References 

Villages in Saskatchewan
Francis No. 127, Saskatchewan
Division No. 6, Saskatchewan